Malmo is an unincorporated community and business district in Aitkin County, Minnesota, United States. The community is located on the northeast corner of Mille Lacs Lake at the junction of State Highway 18, State Highway 47, and Aitkin County Road 2.

Malmo is located within Malmo Township and Lakeside Township. Nearby places include Isle, Glen, Garrison, and Aitkin. The community is located 21 miles southeast of the city of Aitkin. Malmo is named after the Swedish city of Malmö.

References

Unincorporated communities in Minnesota
Unincorporated communities in Aitkin County, Minnesota